The Nall River is located in the Nall Khuzdar Balochistan نال Khuzdar District, in the southwestern section of Balochistan Province, Pakistan.

Rivers of Balochistan (Pakistan)
Rivers of Pakistan